Right to truth is the right, in the case of grave violations of human rights, for the victims and their families or societies to have access to the truth of what happened. The right to truth is closely related to, but distinct from, the state obligation to investigate and prosecute serious state violations of human rights. Right to truth is a form of victims' rights; it is especially relevant to transitional justice in dealing with past abuses of human rights. In 2006, Yasmin Naqvi concluded that the right to truth "stands somewhere on the threshold of a legal norm and a narrative device ... somewhere above a good argument and somewhere below a clear legal rule".

Origins
The idea of a legal right to truth is distinct from the pre-existing understanding of the importance of establishing the truth about what happened in a case of human rights violation. In 1977, Protocol I to the Geneva Conventions enshrined a right for families of people killed in armed conflicts to find out what happened to their relatives. A 1993 conference at the Catholic Institute for International Relations addressed the right to truth. The right to truth has been recognized in international soft law instruments such as the United Nations Principles to Combat Impunity (2005) and UN General Assembly Resolution 60/147, as well as by the 2011 appointment of a United Nations Special Rapporteur on the Promotion of Truth, Justice, Reparation and Guarantees of non-Recurrence. In 2006, the United Nations Human Rights Commission determined that there was an "inalienable and autonomous right" to truth. The International Convention for the Protection of All Persons from Enforced Disappearance also guarantees victims of forced disappearance a right to know the circumstances of the disappearance, but it is not universally ratified.

According to Patricia Naftali, the right to truth remains elusive because it is a concept with different definitions (sometimes contradictory), which is deployed in support of a variety of human rights claims.

Cases

As a result of cases before international courts that find states in breach of human rights, states have been required to:
Conduct effective investigations and prosecute the responsible individuals
Reveal information regarding missing persons
Publicly apologize and acknowledge the violation of human rights
Publish the court judgement
Compensate victims
Reimburse court costs of claimants
Improve security to allow the return of displaced persons
Take steps to avert re-occurrence of the violation
Change national laws
Institute measures to improve compliance with international human rights instruments
Construct memorials to commemorate the human rights violation

United Nations Human Rights Committee
The first case that articulated a right to truth in international human rights jurisprudence was a forced disappearance case, Quinteros v. Uruguay (1983); the UN Human Rights Committee determined that, according to the International Covenant on Civil and Political Rights, the mother of the victim had "the right to know what has happened to her daughter. In these respects, she too is a victim of the violations of the Covenant suffered by her daughter in particular, of article 7 [ICCPR]". In Saadoun v. Algeria (2003), regarding a man who was forcibly disappeared during the Algerian Civil War, the Committee determined that failure to investigate gave rise to a new violation of the ICCPR. In this case, Algeria had proclaimed an amnesty for crimes committed during the "national tragedy".

Inter-American Court of Human Rights
Case law of the Inter-American Court of Human Rights has tended towards an autonomous right to truth. In 1985, six years before Guatemala accepted the jurisdiction of the IACHR, American journalist Nicholas Blake disappeared. In Blake v. Guatemala (1998), the IACHR determined that Guatemalan efforts to obstruct his family's search for the truth constituted inhuman treatment contrary to the American Convention on Human Rights.

The IACHR has often repeated its opinion that:

European Court of Human Rights
There is also case law of the European Court of Human Rights relevant to right to truth. In Cyprus v. Turkey (2001), the ECtHR ruled against Turkey in the case of Greek Cypriots who had been last seen in the custody of Turkish troops. The anguish of surviving relatives constituted a "continuing violation of Article 3 of the European Convention on Human Rights (ECHR) with respect to the relatives of the Greek-Cypriot missing persons." In El-Masri v. Macedonia (2012), the ECtHR established that North Macedonia had violated the Convention in allowing El-Masri to be taken into US custody during extraordinary rendition. The court noted that Macedonian authorities had "deprived the applicant of being informed of what had happened, including of getting an accurate account of the suffering he had allegedly endured and the role of those responsible for his alleged ordeal" as well as hidden this information from the public at large. According to law professor Arianna Vedaschi, "the decision given in El-Masri showed innovative legal reasoning and a wholly innovative attitude of the judges towards the far-reaching enforcement of the right to the truth". In Janowiec and Others v. Russia (2013), the court found no violation of the convention regarding Russian investigations into the 1940 Katyn massacre, but this ruling was on the principle of non-retroactivity because the massacre happened before the ECHR was drafted.

Legal scholar James A. Sweeney criticized the ECtHR's approach to right-to-truth cases, stating that:

National law
Argentine law recognizes the right to truth, with a sui generis legal proceeding called  (trial for the truth) developed in the aftermath of the Argentine military dictatorship.

Potential forums 
It has been suggested that victims might rely on Article 5 of the African Charter on Human and Peoples' Rights in right-to-truth cases before the African Court on Human and Peoples' Rights. The International Criminal Court's victim-centered approach may prove conducive to a right to truth.

Other examples

According to legal scholar Agostina Latino, the right to truth related to the Armenian genocide extends beyond Armenian genocide survivors to their descendants as well as Armenians at large. Latino states that, as the successor to the Ottoman government that committed the genocide, the Turkish government's ongoing Armenian genocide denial violates their right to truth. For example, there are monuments and streets named after the perpetrators, but not the victims.

The Inter-American Court and some theorists have suggested that truth-telling may be a form of partial reparations to victims of human rights abuses. Right to truth is related to the fight against impunity as establishing the truth about a past event is the first step in holding perpetrators accountable.

Right to Truth Day
Since 2010, the UN has commemorated International Day for the Right to the Truth Concerning Gross Human Rights Violations and for the Dignity of Victims, or Right to Truth Day, on 24 March, the anniversary of the murder of El Salvador archbishop Óscar Arnulfo Romero.

See also
Truth commission

References

Further reading

Human rights
Transitional justice
Enforced disappearance
Victims' rights
Impunity